Fuyuan (Russian: Фуюань) is a county-level city of the province of Heilongjiang, China. It is under the jurisdiction of the prefecture-level city of Jiamusi.

Geography

Fuyuan is located in the lowlands at the confluence of the Heilongjiang (Amur) River and Wusuli (Ussuri) Rivers. The city seat, Fuyuan Town, sits on the southern bank of the Amur. On the opposite side of the river is Russia's Jewish Autonomous Region.

Fuyuan is China's easternmost county-level division. Its northern and eastern borders, running along the Heilongjiang (Amur) and Wusuli (Ussuri) Rivers, are also parts of China's international border with Russia.

The city is a major grain producer.

Administrative divisions 
Fuyuan City is divided into 5 towns and 5 townships. 
5 towns
 Fuyuan, Hanconggou, Nongqiao, Wusu, Heixiazidao
5 townships
 Tongjiang, Nongjiang, Haiqing, Beilahong, Yanan

Demographics 

Climate
Fuyuan has a humid continental climate (Köppen: Dwa) bordering on Dwb, with long, cold winters, but also dry, although less extreme than more inland locations of Heilongjiang.

Transportation
There is a railway station in Fuyuan, the railway having reached the city center only in 2011.
As of late 2013, schedule systems list one passenger train a day serving Fuyuan; it comes from Harbin via Jiamusi, covering  in 17.5 hours.

Fuyuan has port facilities on the Amur River as well.

Fuyuan Dongji Airport opened in 2014.

Sport
Fuyuan is one of the cities in which China Bandy Federation explores the potential for bandy development.

See also

 List of extreme points of China

Notes and references

External links
 Official site

Fuyuan